In the United Kingdom, war ministry may refer to the following British wartime ministries of the 20th century:
 Lloyd George war ministry (1916–1919)
 Chamberlain war ministry (1939–1940)
 Churchill war ministry (1940–1945)

See also
 United Kingdom coalition government (disambiguation)
 War cabinet